Kottathara or Venniyode is a gram panchayat of Wayanad district, Kerala State, India.

Location
Kottathara is located near Kambalakkad town on Kalpetta - Mananthavady route. Venniyode is a small township which is located on the link road between Kamblakkad and Padinharathara. Valal is the nearest village from Venniode Junction.

Administration
Even though Kottathara is a small town, it has its own administrative structure called a panchayath. It is under LSGD Government of Kerala. The headquarters of the Panchayath is located at Venniyod town.

Village officer: Mr Jemini Kumar

Venniyode Junction
Venniyode Junction is the headquarters of Kottathara village. There are a few village teashops, schools and temples in this village center.  The sacred grove called Paradhevatha Kavu is well maintained and attracts many visitors. This is a sacred grove with many holy stones painted white and a little vishnu temple attached to it. There is also one Jain temple here.

Transportation
Kottathara can be accessed from Mananthavady, Kalpetta and via Pinangode town. The Periya ghat road connects Mananthavady to Kannur and Thalassery.  The Thamarassery mountain road connects Calicut with Kalpetta. The Kuttiady mountain road connects Vatakara with Kalpetta and Mananthavady. The Palchuram mountain road connects Kannur and Iritty with Mananthavady.  The road from Nilambur to Ooty is also connected to Wayanad through the village of Meppadi. There is KSRTC services and private bus for Transportation. 

The nearest railway station is at Mysore and the nearest airports are Kozhikode International Airport-120 km, Bengaluru International Airport-290 km, and Kannur International Airport, 58 km.

Location

Gallery

References

Villages in Wayanad district
Mananthavady Area